Kenneth King, born in Dublin, Ireland (1939 - 2019) was a notable international marine artist who was a Chaplain in the Royal Navy before he became a full-time artist. King's studio, "Straid Studio-Gallery", is in Glencolmcille, a Gaeltacht or Irish language speaking region in County Donegal, Ireland.

King's father was Richard King, best known for his designs of Irish postage stamps and his work in stained glass.

King specialises in depicting the naval and merchant shipping of Ireland, as well as seascapes of the country's coastline and lighthouses.  He has been commissioned by the Royal National Lifeboat Institution, Irish Shipping, An Post, Bord Iascaigh Mhara, the Maritime Institute of Ireland and the Office of Public Works.

The National Maritime Museum of Ireland has paintings, by Kenneth King, of all the Irish ships lost during World War II.  Irish Shipping had commissioned King to paint pictures of all their ships.  When Irish Shipping was liquidated, the receiver sold the collection at auction.  The Maritime Institute of Ireland acquired some of the paintings;  they concentrated on ships lost during World War II.  Later, at the instigation of Des Brannigan,  then President of the Institution, the Institute commissioned King to paint pictures of the other Irish Ships lost during the war. This collection is on display in the National Maritime Museum of Ireland. The collection lacks one image: the Naomh Garbhan which hit a mine off the Waterford coast and sank with the loss of three lives on 2 May 1945.


Exhibitions 
Recent exhibitions by King include:
2014 'Vitality of the Sea' exhibition of marine oils, Sirius Arts Centre, Cobh, Co. Cork.
2013 'Kenneth King: Saol agus Saothar' - An Gailearaí, Na Doirí Beaga, Co Dhún na nGall.
2012 'Bound for Blue Water' - an exhibition of marine oils, Rosses Point, Co. Sligo.

Bibliography 
Kenneth King, Life and Works by Marianne O'Kane Boal

References

External links

 
Local news article for Kenneth King in the Glencolmcille community website. 

Marine artists
Artists from Dublin (city)
Year of birth missing (living people)